North County High School is an Anne Arundel County Public Schools high school located in Glen Burnie, Maryland, United States.  The school was established in 1990 as a result of the merger of Andover High School and Brooklyn Park High School. It later moved into the former Lindale Junior High School building, with Lindale moving to the former Andover site. The school mascot is the Knight and the school colors are silver, red and black, chosen by the school students and faculty of both Andover and Brooklyn Park High Schools. North County's rival is Glen Burnie High School. It is the primary high school for students living in Linthicum, Brooklyn Park, Ferndale, and portions of the Glen Burnie and Hanover areas.

North County High School has a rigorous STEM Magnet Program, and the IT3 (International Trade, Transportation, and Tourism) Signature Program.  The school has a multitude of college course offerings such as Advanced Placement.  North County became one of the campuses for Anne Arundel Community College in 2012. In 2016, North County High School German teacher, Katrina Griffin, was named the 2017 National Language Teacher of the Year by the American Council on the Teaching of Foreign Languages.

Sport programs

 Fall
 Cheerleading
 Cross Country
 Field Hockey
 Football
 Golf
 Soccer
 Volleyball
 Winter
 Basketball
 Cheerleading
 Indoor Track
 Swimming
 Wrestling
 Spring
 Baseball  
 Lacrosse 
 Softball
 Tennis 
 Track and Field

Clubs/activities
North County High School offers varies after-school activity for students including:

Academic clubs
 American Computer Science League
 Cyber Patriot
 Don't Hate Collaborate
 Environmental Club
 Envirothon
 F.B.L.A
 German Honor Society
 It's Academic
 Key Club
 Math Team
 Mock Trial
 Model United Nations
 National Honor Society
 National Art Honor Society
 Science Olympiad
 Spanish Honor Society
 Student Government
 Technology Student Association

Fine arts clubs
 Botball
 Drama Club
 Gaming Club
 Film Club
 Literary Magazine
 Multi-Ethnic Club
 Newspaper (Knightline)
 Stage Crew
 Travel & Tourism
 Yearbook
 Webmaster
 National Art Honor Society

Music clubs
 Band Boosters
 Chorus
 Concert band
 Guitar Ensemble
 Jazz band
 Marching band
 Orchestra

Notable alumni
Dan Patrick (Andover High) - Texas Lt Governor 
Montel Williams (Andover High) - Television Personality
Jim Spencer (Andover High) - Major League Baseball player
John C. Inglis (Andover High) - former Deputy Director of the National Security Agency
Diane Black (Warren) (Andover High)  US Congresswoman Tennessee
Lloyd Keaser (Brooklyn Park High) - Wrestling Olympic silver medalist (1976) and World Champion Gold medalist (1973)
Trevelin Queen - National Basketball Association player

References

External links
 NCHS School Information 2008 on AACPS website
 Public School Review on NCHS
 

Glen Burnie, Maryland
Public high schools in Maryland
Schools in Anne Arundel County, Maryland
Magnet schools in Maryland
Educational institutions established in 1991
1991 establishments in Maryland